Tierras Altas District is a district (distrito) of Chiriquí Province in Panama. It was created by Law 13 of September 13, 2013, after splitting off from Bugaba District.

Administrative divisions 
Tierras Altas District is divided administratively into the following corregimientos:

 Volcán
 Cerro Punta
 Cuesta de Piedra
 Nueva California
 Paso Ancho

External links
 https://en.tierrasaltaschiriqui.com/  Online information center for visitors and residents

References 

Districts of Panama
Chiriquí Province
States and territories established in 2013